La Bazoge is a commune in the Sarthe department in the region of Pays de la Loire in north-western France. It is twinned with the village of Bardney in Lincolnshire and Martfeld (Deutschland).

See also
Communes of the Sarthe department

References

Communes of Sarthe